Eumichtis is a subgenus of moths of the genus Polymixis, and the family Noctuidae.

References
Natural History Museum Lepidoptera genus database

Cuculliinae